{{Infobox officeholder
| name = Sukhdev Singh Babbar
| image = Sukhdev_singh_babbar.jpg
| alt                = Sukhdev Singh Babbar
| image_size = 200px
| caption = 
| birth_name = Sukhdev Singh Dasuwal
| birth_date = 
| birth_place = Dhassuwal, Patti, Amritsar, India
| death_date = 
| death_place = Patiala, Punjab, India
| nationality = Indian
| office1 = Co-Chief of Babbar Khalsa International
| predecessor1 = Position Established
| successor1 = Uncertain
| parents = Jind Singh and Harnam Kaur
| native_name        = 
| native_name_lang   = 
| pronunciation      = 
| death_cause        = 
| body_discovered    = 
| other_names        = 
| citizenship        = 
| education          = 
| alma_mater         = 
| years_active       = 
| era                = 
| employer           = 
| organization       = Babbar Khalsa International
| agent              =  
| known_for          = 
| notable_works      =  
| style              = 
| height             =  
| television         = 
| title              =  
| term               = 
| predecessor        = 
| successor          = 
| party              = 
| movement           = Khalistan movement  (East , West 
| opponents          = 
| boards             = 
| criminal_charge    =  
| criminal_penalty   = 
| criminal_status    = 
| spouse             =  
| partner            =  
| children           = 
| relatives          = 
| family             = 
| callsign           = 
| awards             = 
}}Jathedar Sukhdev Singh Babbar' (9 August 1955 − 9 August 1992) was the co-leader of Babbar Khalsa International (BKI), a Sikh terrorist organization involved in the pursuit of creating a theocratic Sikh nation they call "Khalistan" and found responsible for the 1985 bombing of Air India Flight 182. BKI was founded by Talwinder Singh Parmar, himself, and Amarjit Kaur. He commanded BKI continuously for 14 years until he was killed in 1992.He was a member of the AKJ.

Early life

Sukhdev Singh Dasuwal was born on 9 August 1955 to Jind Singh and Harnam Kaur in the village of Dassuwal, Patti, Amritsar, Punjab, India. He studied up to the middle school level. He had three brothers. His elder brother, Mehal Singh "Babbar" is also an active leader of the Babbar Khalsa International. The older brother of all three, Angrej Singh, is blind. His family owned  of land in the village of Dassuwal. The wives of Sukhdev Singh Babbar and Mehal Singh Babbar are sisters who belonged to the adjoining village of Ghariala.

Participation in the Khalistan movement

As per The Tribune, the day of the Sikh–Nirankari clashes (13 April 1978) was also the day when his marriage was fixed. On this day, he took the pledge to take revenge on the Nirankaris. He founded the organization Babbar Khalsa International along with Talwinder Singh Parmar with the objective to secede from India and form the state of Khalistan for Sikhs. The first Unit of BKI was founded in Canada in 1981. This organization has presence in the United States, Canada, UK, Germany, France, Belgium, Norway, Switzerland and Pakistan. Babbar Khalsa International became a major participant in Khalistan movement under his guidance and participated in hundreds of operations against Indian security forces and remained active in several Indian states.

Sukhdev Singh Babbar was the president of the Babbar Khalsa International. It was considered as the best armed and funded among the Khalistani militant groups in Punjab State with an objective to create an independent state for Sikhs, known as Khalistan. During the Khalistan movement, Sukhdev Singh Babbar was a  militant chief of Babbar Khalsa International.

Death

He died on 9 August 1992 in a gunfight when heavily armed policemen stormed a villa in the city of Patiala in early August and captured him. At the time, he was India's most wanted Khalistani extremist.

It is reported that India used the cat system (Special Forces personnel disguised as militant), to trap Babbar. He was captured with the help of a former Babbar member turned police-cat, who informed on him in exchange for a reward of ₹ 10,00,000. This former member helped trap Babbar by arranging a meeting of top Babbar militants, ostensibly to work out future strategy. For helping neutralize the chief of the most powerful group of militants in the state, the turned member also received a full third of the reward on Singh.

 Aftermath 
After the death of Babbar, his followers killed policemen in retaliation.

After his death, Punjab Police DGP Kanwar Pal Singh Gill accused Babbar of living a "king-like''" lifestyle. In his book, "Punjab: The Knights of Falsehoods", he accused Babbar of living a lavish lifestyle contradictory to the ideals of his organization, and claimed that he owned multiple lavish bungalows. He further accused Babbar of living with Jawahar Kaur, a member of a popular singing group "Nabhe Wallian Bibian Da Jatha", and fathering an illegitimate child.

After his death his family members left their home and moved abroad. A major portion of his ancestral house of the Babbar Khalsa chief now stands demolished and the remaining dilapidated two-room set is locked.

References

1955 births
1992 deaths
Khalistan movement people
Punjabi people
Sikh terrorism
People shot dead by law enforcement officers in India
Insurgency in Punjab